Maryland Steel, in Sparrows Point, Maryland, US, was founded in 1887. It was acquired by Bethlehem Shipbuilding Corporation in 1916 and renamed as the Bethlehem Sparrows Point Shipyard. The shipyard was sold in 1997 to Baltimore Marine Industries Inc.. In 2012, it was owned by Barletta Industries, which had converted it to the Sparrows Point Shipyard and Industrial Complex. As of 2021, it is owned by Sparrows Point Terminal, LLC and has been renamed Tradepoint Atlantic.

History

Maryland Steel built tugs, coastal passengers, dredges, cargo ships and a few destroyers. Following the purchase by Bethlehem, it serviced and repaired ships and manufactured industrial products.

Facilities at the yard included a graving dock, a floating drydock and two full-service outfitting piers which together provided nearly 3,000 feet of berthing space.

World War II
During World War II, the Sparrows Point Shipyard built ships as part of the U.S. government's Emergency Shipbuilding Program to help re-build the British Merchant Navy. Liberty ship production was a primary goal of the yard.  The shipyard also constructed 21 Cimarron-class oilers from 1938 to 1946.

Once part of a chain of 17 shipyards operating under BethShip, the Sparrows Point Shipyard was the only location remaining by 1990.

Baltimore Marine Industries, Inc.
In October 1997, the shipyard was sold to the Veritas Capital Fund, a New York-based merchant banking and investment firm which built a $300 million cold rolling mill complex on the site which opened in 1999. Veritas reorganized the facility as Baltimore Marine Industries, Inc. (BMI) and won two US Navy contracts for new ship construction and dismantling of older tonnage.

Although BMI was selected to build a fleet of deluxe cruise ships, the cruise line was never able to secure financing. With no orders on the horizon and no work aside from the two modest Navy contracts, BMI collapsed in bankruptcy in 2003.

Barletta Industries
All assets were purchased by Barletta Industries Inc. in 2004 and reorganized as the Sparrows Point Shipyard and Industrial Complex. Barletta claims it has modernized the infrastructure and refurbished the yard to prepare for leasing specific yard structures, buildings and land to companies in maritime and heavy industry.

Liquidation 
The plant continued to change hands, from ArcelorMittal to Severstal (for $810 million) to Renco Group (R.G. Steel; for $1.2 billion) and finally to liquidator Hilco Trading in 2012 (for $72 million). Hilco sold the plant's cold mill to Nucor in 2013. The blast furnace was demolished in January 2015.

The property is now owned by Sparrows Point Terminal, LLC, a partnership of Hilco and Redwood Capital Investments, who has renamed it "Tradepoint Atlantic". The site has been granted "zoning flexibility" and Enterprise Zone tax credits. Future tenants include FedEx.

See also
Bethlehem Steel
Steelworkers and Shipyard Workers for Equality

References

External links
 Papers of Frederick W. Wood at Hagley Museum and Library. Wood was a designer and constructor of the Sparrows Point steel plant and shipyard. He was also its president through its sale to the Bethlehem Steel Company.
 The Research notes on Bethlehem Steel Corporation at Hagley Museum and Library consist of materials collected by John B. Lovis for the writing of his book on the history of the Sparrows Point Plant, plus original Bethlehem Steel documents from his tenure in the Corporate Planning Department.
 Robert W. Pemberton papers, 1918-1999. 3.00 linear feet, at the University of Maryland Libraries, State of Maryland and Historical Collections. Working files of a National Vice President and Secretary-Treasurer of Industrial Union of Marine and Shipbuilding Workers of America who was associated with the Sparrows Point and Key Highway shipyards in Baltimore.

Defunct shipbuilding companies of the United States
 
Bethlehem shipyards
Shipyards of the United States
Bethlehem Steel
Industrial buildings and structures in Maryland
Defunct manufacturing companies based in Maryland